Trudovaya is a rural locality (a settlement) in Mytishchinsky District of Moscow Oblast, Russia, located  northwest from Mytishchi. Population: 62 (2005 est.).

References

Notes

Sources

Rural localities in Moscow Oblast
Mytishchinsky District